Rocketry SA is the official voice and controlling body for all aspects of non-commercial and non-governmental rocketry in South Africa. The organization is registered as a non profit organization in South Africa. Rocketry SA promotes model rocketry, high-power rocketry, amateur rocketry, and aerospace modelling.

History
The organization was established in 2003, under the name South African Amateur Space Association (SAASA).

During the 2013 Annual General Meeting of the Association, members voted in favour of a name change. Due to practical reasons, however, and in line with the legal requirements  of registering a non-profit organization in South Africa, the name was only officially changed in 2017 to "Rocketry SA".

Organizational structure
Rocketry SA functions as a member-based, non-profit organization.
In line with South African law, the Organization appoints a CEO (chief executive office), supported by an EXCO (Executive committee).

Rocketry SA co-exists under the government-mandated South African National Space Agency (SANSA), which resides under the Department of Science and Technology (DSC), which in turn reports to the Minister of Science and Technology.

Membership
Rocketry SA membership is open to any with a keen interest in promoting rocketry.
Rocketry SA maintains a database of all registered rocketeers. This database includes information like certification level, which is used to determine which motors may be purchased by the member.

External links
 Official website

References 

Rocketry
Space program of South Africa